State Highway 52 (SH 52) is a  long state highway in northeastern Colorado. The western terminus is at SH 119 near Niwot, and the eastern terminus is at SH 14 in Raymer.

Route description

SH 52 begins near Niwot, running east from its western terminus past US 287 to a diamond interchange with I-25, near the towns of Dacono, Frederick, and Firestone. The highway continues east through interchanges with US 85 in Fort Lupton and I-76 in Hudson.

Major intersections

References

External links

 Colorado Highways: Routes 1 to 100

052
Transportation in Boulder County, Colorado
Transportation in Weld County, Colorado
Transportation in Morgan County, Colorado
Fort Morgan, Colorado